Tianyang railway station is the main railway station in Tianyang District, Baise, Guangxi, China that formally became part of the Nanning–Baise section of the Nanning–Kunming high-speed railway on 11 December 2015. It was originally built as part of the Nanning–Kunming railway. It was opened shortly after the formal opening of the railway in 1997.

Specifications
The station and its grounds occupy , and the original construction included a maximum capacity for 300 people at one time in the traveller buildings and  a long main side and an island platforms servicing 3 of the 4 tracks.

References

Railway stations in Guangxi
Railway stations in China opened in 1997
Stations on the Nanning–Kunming high-speed railway